The following tables show state-by-state results in the Australian Senate at the 2004 federal election. Senators total 37 coalition (33 Liberal, three coalition National, one CLP), 28 Labor, four Green, one Family First, two non-coalition National and four Democrats. Senator terms are six years (three for territories), and took their seats from 1 July 2005, except the territories who took their seats immediately.

Preference deals
The Greens directed preferences to the Democrats and Labor ahead of the Coalition, Family First and the Christian Democrats. In exchange, the Democrats preferenced the Greens ahead of both major parties and Labor preferenced the Greens and Democrats first in every state and territory except for Tasmania, where Labor preferenced Family First ahead of the Greens and Democrats, and Victoria, where Labor preferenced Family First, Democratic Labor and the Christian Democrats ahead of the Greens and the Democrats.

The Family First Party preferenced the Democrats and the Christian Democrats ahead of both major parties. In exchange, the Democrats preferenced Family First ahead of both the Greens and both major parties, while the Christian Democrats also preferenced Family First highly. The Family First Party and the Coalition also preferenced each other ahead of Labor and the Greens.

One Nation was preferenced last by Labor, the Democrats, the Coalition and the Greens in every state, while the Greens was preferenced last by Family First, One Nation and the Christian Democrats in every state.

A full listing of preferences can be found here.

Australia

New South Wales

The primary vote saw the Coalition winning three seats and Labor winning two, leaving the Greens and Labor leading the Christian Democrats for the final seat. Preferences from liberals for forests, Family First, the Democrats and One Nation meant that the Christian Democrats ended up overtaking both Labor and the Greens for the final vacancy, but Labor managed to stay ahead of the Greens, meaning that Labor ending up taking the final seat using Green preferences. The result was three seats coalition and three seats Labor.

Victoria

Primary votes ensured that the Coalition secured three senate seats and Labor secured two. This left the Greens leading with Labor not far behind as preferences began counting. In an attempt to protect their third candidate, Jacinta Collins, Labor made a deal with several groups including the Democratic Labor Party, Family First Party and the Christian Democrats where they would preference her ahead of the Coalition in exchange for Labor preferences, expecting them to be eliminated before these preferences could be distributed. However, it backfired badly as the Family First Party, despite starting with less than two percent of the primary vote, received many preferences from the Christian Democrats, the Aged and Disability Pensioners Party, One Nation, the Coalition, liberals for forests, the Australian Democrats and the Democratic Labor Party that easily put Family First ahead of Labor. And, as per the Jacinta Collins deal, the majority of the Labor preferences went to Family First too, meaning that Steve Fielding was comfortably elected ahead of Greens candidate David Risstrom. The result was three seats Coalition, two seats Labor and one seat Family First.

Queensland

Primary votes saw two Labor and two Liberal senators get elected, leaving the Liberal Party well ahead of the National Party, the Greens and former One Nation leader Pauline Hanson, who this election ran as an independent. Pauline Hanson attracted a lot of preferential votes, which meant that her former party was surprisingly excluded before she was. This meant that her preferences could not go to One Nation and threaten the Liberal and National parties. As such, the National Party, using Fishing Party preferences, won the fifth seat and the Liberals won the sixth seat. The result was three seats Liberal, two seats Labor and one seat National.

Western Australia

Primary votes saw three Liberal and two Labor senators get elected, leaving the Greens with a sizeable lead against the Liberals. Preferences from the Democrats and Labor saw that lead extended even further, and Greens candidate Rachel Siewert comfortably took the final vacancy. The result was three seats Liberal, two seats Labor and one seat Greens.

South Australia

Primary votes saw three Liberal seats and two Labor seats secured. With South Australia being the former constituent of former Democrats leader now Progressive Alliance leader Meg Lees, the state saw the largest swing against the Democrats and the largest total for the Progressive Alliance. ABC Election Analyst Antony Green suggested that had the Democrats done better in the primary vote in South Australia, they may have won the final senate seat on Family First preferences. Instead, the Democrat preferences saw Family First go ahead of the Greens, leading to Labor winning the seat on Green preferences. The result was three seats Liberal and three seats Labor.

Tasmania

Primary votes saw the Liberal Party winning three senate seats and Labor winning two, leaving the Greens leading for the sixth seat against the Family First Party with a sizable majority. However, Tasmania was one of two states where Labor preferenced the Family First Party ahead the Greens, meaning that the Family First candidate Jacquie Petrusma was expected to receive large amounts of preferences and win the final seat. However, Greens candidate Christine Milne ended up winning the seat, mainly due to the high amount of "below the line" voting in Tasmania. The result was three seats Liberal, two seats Labor and one seat Green.

Territories

Australian Capital Territory

Northern Territory

See also 
 Candidates of the 2004 Australian federal election
 Members of the Australian Senate, 2005–2008

Notes

References

2004 elections in Australia
Senate 2004
Australian Senate elections